Dean James Robert Rance (born 24 September 1991) is an English footballer who plays for Dagenham & Redbridge  as a defensive midfielder.

Career
Born in Maidstone, Kent, Rance joined the Gillingham Centre of Excellence at the age of eight. He started an apprenticeship with the club during the summer of 2008 and his good form for the youth team earned him a call-up for the first team squad, being named on the bench for Gillingham's FA Cup game against Aston Villa in January 2009. Rance finished the 2009–10 season as the youth team's top goalscorer, and in May 2010 signed his first professional contract with the club. However, his opportunities in the first team were limited in the 2010–11 season by a foot injury sustained during a pre-season friendly.

Despite this, he impressed during loan spells with non-League sides Maidstone United and Bishop's Stortford. He signed a new one-year contract with Gillingham ahead of the 2011–12 season, during which he made his first team debut as a substitute in an FA Cup first round replay against Bournemouth in November 2011.

Rance was loaned out to Conference South side Dover Athletic on a one-month loan on 2 March 2012. He was released by Gillingham in May 2012 and signed a permanent contract with Dover.

Ahead of the 2013–14 season, Rance signed for Ebbsfleet United. Rance quickly established himself as a fan favourite at Stonebridge Road and was named players' player of the season despite being sent off in the play-off final second leg at Bromley and thus missing the play-off final against his former club, Dover.

Career statistics

References

External links

1991 births
Living people
Sportspeople from Maidstone
English footballers
Association football midfielders
Gillingham F.C. players
Maidstone United F.C. players
Bishop's Stortford F.C. players
Dover Athletic F.C. players
Ebbsfleet United F.C. players
Aldershot Town F.C. players
Dagenham & Redbridge F.C. players
National League (English football) players